Gowri Munjal (born 9 August 1985) is an Indian actress and model. She has frequently appeared in South Indian films and is probably best known for her performance as Mahalakshmi Somaraju in her debut film Bunny.

Career
When she moved to Mumbai to pursue a career in acting, she got to know, that the producers of the Telugu film Bunny were looking for a new face to play the leading female role opposite Allu Arjun. She met the producers and immediately got the role of Mahalakshmi Somaraju, eventually becoming an actress. The film went to become a box office hit, after which she received acting offers from other South Indian film industries as well. She debuted in Kannada in the same year with the film Namma Basava, whilst in Telugu she played leading roles in Sri Krishna 2006 and Gopi - Goda Meedha Pilli.

Gowri Munjal then got the offer to essay the female leading role in a Tamil film, directed by P. Vasu, starring his son Sakthi Vasu in the lead role, following which she starred in another Tamil film Singakutty opposite Sivaji Ganesan's grandson, named Sivaji as well. Both the film were unsuccessful at the box office, failing to gain her popularity and fame in Kollywood. In Telugu, however, she got to play a vital role in Kousalya Supraja Rama  as Charmi's sibling, whilst in Kannada she enacted the female lead in Jaaji Mallige, a remake of the Tamil film Devathayai Kanden. In 2009 then, she got a role in a Malayalam film Paleri Manikkam, a crime thriller, based on the same-named novel by T. P. Rajeevan, which was directed by popular director Ranjith and in which she appeared opposite Malayalam actor Mammootty.

Filmography

References

External links
 Official website
 
 Gowri Munjal interview
 Exclusive Photoshoot

Living people
Indian film actresses
Actresses from New Delhi
Actresses in Tamil cinema
Actresses in Malayalam cinema
Actresses in Kannada cinema
1985 births
21st-century Indian actresses
Actresses in Telugu cinema